Unity Croshaw was a colonist of British Colonial Virginia, the first surviving European colony in North America. Born in the colony, she was the daughter of Major Joseph Croshaw, and a  granddaughter of Raleigh Croshaw, who came to the Colony of Virginia in 1608 with the Second Supply to Jamestown.  She married Colonel John West.

Biography

Unity Croshaw is believed to have been born about 1636 to Joseph Croshaw and his 1st wife. Unity was a middle child and had as many as four sisters and brothers.
Unity married Colonel John West sometime before November 1664.  As a result of the marriage, and the early death of Unity's half-brother, the intended heir, Croshaw's plantation at "Poplar Neck" passed to John West.

Unity Croshaw and John West had the following children:

John West III, married Judith Armistead, daughter of Anthony Armistead.
Thomas West 1669–1714, married Agnes 1670-1720
Nathaniel West, married Martha Woodward, widow of Gideon Macon.
Anne West, married Henry Fox.

Unity died after 30 October 1693, when she relinquished dower in "Poplar Neck."

References

Sources
"Records of York County, Croshaw, vol. 1664-1672, p. 257"
"Notes and Queries", The William and Mary Quarterly, Vol. 2, No. 4 (Apr., 1894)
"Tax Rolls, March 1660. 3 March 1659."

Virginia colonial people
Unity Croshaw